The Menard V12 engine is a naturally-aspirated, V-12 racing engine, designed, developed and produced by Menard Competition Technologies (MCT), in partnership and collaboration with Élan Motorsport Technologies, and specially made for the Panoz DP09 Superleague Formula open-wheel race car.

Engine design
The engine itself was made by Menard Competition Technologies, and is a 60-degree, 4.2-liter, N/A V12 engine; able to produce 750 hp at 11,750 rpm and rev up to 12,000 rpm, with a max torque of 510 Nm.

Engine details
 No of Cylinders: 12
 Capacity: 4.2 litres
 Configuration: 60-degree V formation
 Weight: 140 kg (308 lb) Dry
 Peak Power: 750 bhp (560 kW) @ 11,750 rpm
 Maximum RPM: 12,000
 Peak Torque: 510 N·m (376 ft·lb) @ 9,500-10,500 rpm

Applications
Panoz DP09

References

Panoz Auto Development
Superleague Formula
V12 engines
Engines by model
Gasoline engines by model